Anselme Mathieu (21 April 1828 – 8 February 1895) was a French Provençal poet.

Early life
Anselme Mathieu was born 21 April 1828 in Châteauneuf-du-Pape. His parents were the fourth-generation owners of the Domaine Mathieu, a vineyard still in operation today.

Poetry
Mathieu was a Provençal poet. He published poems in Armana prouvençau under the pseudonym of Félibre di Poutoun.

On 21 May 1854, he co-founded the Félibrige movement with Joseph Roumanille, Frédéric Mistral, Théodore Aubanel, Jean Brunet, Paul Giéra and Alphonse Tavan.

He published La Farandole, a collection of poems, in 1862. Mistral contributed the foreword.

Wine
Mathieu introduced the co-founders of the Félibrige to the red wine produced by his family vineyard. Moreover, he introduced it to Alphonse Daudet, another writer from Provence, who called it, "royal, imperial, pontifical."

Additionally, Mathieu introduced Alexandre Dumas and Alphonse de Lamartine, two writers from Paris, to this wine.

Death
He died on 8 February 1895.

Legacy
The Collège Anselme Mathieu, a secondary school in Avignon, is named in his honour.

References

1828 births
1895 deaths
People from Vaucluse
French poets
19th-century poets